Ana Lima may refer to:
 Ana Lima (actress), Brazilian actress
 Ana Lima (volleyball), Brazilian volleyball player
 Ana Clara Lima, Brazilian reporter and presenter
 Ana Luiza Lima, Brazilian artistic gymnast